

Simpson is a locality in the Northern Territory of Australia located about  south-east of the territory capital of Darwin and about  south-east of the municipal seat in Alice Springs in the territory’s south-east corner adjoining the states of Queensland and South Australia.

The locality consists of the following land (from north to south and then from west to east):
Land described as NT Portions 4208, 4918 and 7065
 The Pmer Ulpere Ingwemirne Arletherre Aboriginal Land Trust and land described as NT Portions 4209 and 4917.

The locality’s boundaries and name were gazetted on 4 April 2007.  Its name is derived from the Simpson Desert which was named in 1929 by C. T. Madigan after AA Simpson who was the President of the South Australian Branch of the Royal Geographical Society.

The 2016 Australian census which was conducted in August 2016 reports that Simpson had no people living within its boundaries.

Simpson is located within the federal division of Lingiari, the territory electoral division of Namatjira and the local government area of the MacDonnell Region.

References

Populated places in the Northern Territory
MacDonnell Region